The Pontiac LeMans  is a model name that was applied to subcompact- and intermediate-sized automobiles marketed by Pontiac from 1961 to 1981 (1983 in Canada) and 1988-1993 model years. Originally a trim upgrade based on the Tempest, it became a separate model. In 1964 the Tempest was available with an optional GTO package that later became a separate model, the Pontiac GTO, muscle car. 1970 introduced the GT-37 package.

Manufactured in five generations in the 1960s and 1970s, it was replaced by the downsized Pontiac Grand Am. From 1988 to 1993 the name was resurrected for a badge-engineered version of the Daewoo LeMans manufactured by Daewoo in South Korea.

It is named for the French city of Le Mans which has been the site of the 24 Hours of Le Mans, the world's oldest active endurance sports car race since it began in 1923.

First generation (1961–1963)

1961
The LeMans was introduced as the top trim package of the compact-sized Pontiac Tempest toward the end of the 1961 model year on GM's new Y body platform. The Tempest LeMans featured sportier and more luxurious features and standard equipment than the Tempest, including different badging and bucket seats. The trim option was available only on the two-door sedan (pillared coupe) body style.

1962
For the 1962 model year, the LeMans was still a trim package that was now also available in the convertible body style, as well as with the  inline-four 4-bbl carbureted engine. There was also no pillarless hardtop body style available in either the Tempest and LeMans versions.

1963
For 1963, the LeMans name was still used only on two-door coupes and convertibles, but now was designated as a separate model in the Pontiac compact car lineup. This would last for just one year. Optional was a high-performance "336 CID V8" engine. The  four was also available.

Second generation (1964–1967)

1964

The Tempest line was changed to an intermediate-sized car on the new GM A platform in 1964. The LeMans was its own separate model like it was in 1963 which included carpeted lower door panels, deluxe steering wheels, courtesy lighting, and full wheel covers. For 1964, a two-door hardtop was added. A new  I6 was introduced, as well as a redesigned  V8 that now actually displaced 326 CID.

Shortly after the start of the 1964 model year, the LeMans became available with a new performance package designated as the GTO, or 'Gran Turismo Omologato'.

1965

Pontiac's 1965 A-body intermediates included Tempest, Tempest Custom, Lemans, and GTO. The entire line was restyled, adding  to the overall length while retaining the same wheelbase and interior dimensions. The new model had Pontiac's characteristic vertically stacked quad headlights. The dashboard design was changed, and a breakerless transistor ignition was a new option. A 326 cubic inch High Output engine was available with 4-barrel carburation for Tempest and Lemans. The 326 HO produces . The LeMans line was expanded to include a four-door sedan for the 1965 model year.

1966

The pillared 4-door sedan was replaced by a four-door hardtop body style for the 1966 model year.
 
The GTO became a separate model of its own for 1966, though retaining the same basic body as the Tempest and LeMans models. For 1966, all Pontiac intermediates got new styling featuring tunnelback rooflines on two-door hardtop and pillared coupes. While the GTO continued as a big-engined muscle car, the Tempest and LeMans models got a new SOHC  straight-six as the base engine. This engine, as well as the early Tempest with the transaxle in the rear, were ideas of Pontiac's Chief Engineer John DeLorean (who became Pontiac's general manager at the end of the 1965 model year). This engine was available in an economical one-barrel carbureted, 165 hp version as standard equipment on all Pontiac intermediates except GTOs. Optional on all Tempest and LeMans models except station wagons was a Sprint package that included a four-barrel version of the I6 that also included higher compression ratio and hotter cam, resulting in 207 horsepower, along with an "all-syncro" floor-mounted three-speed transmission with Hurst shifter, suspension kit, and body striping.

The Sprint-optioned Tempest and LeMans models were not popular during the mid-to-late 1960s, being outsold by the bigger-engined GTO. The Sprint option and SOHC six-cylinder engine were discontinued after 1969, and replaced with a Chevrolet-built  OHV six-cylinder engine, becoming the base engine from 1970 to 1976 in most Pontiac intermediates.

Third generation (1968–1972)

The four-door Safari station wagon became available for the 1968 model year in the Tempest line. A new engine replaced the 326. This new engine was based on all existing Pontiac engine architecture and using the 326, 389, and 400 engines crank at 3.75" and expanding the 326's 3.72" bore to 3.88" to give 353.84 cubic inches. It was marketed by Pontiac as a 350, just like the original 326 was called rather than its true size of 325.84. For 1968 the 350 was available in two versions as a 265 hp 2-bbl and a 325 hp 4-bbl.

1969

In 1969 the engine came as 265 hp 2bbl and 330 hp 4bbl. The ten horsepower increase over 1968's engine is due to a different cam plus the use of the #48 big valve heads, the same head used on the Ram Air 3 400-cubic inch  engine and the 428-HO engine at 390 hp. 1969 would be the last high performance version of the 350.

1970

For 1970, Pontiac’s intermediate lineup was reshuffled to include the Tempest, Lemans, Lemans Sport, GTO and GTO Judge series. The Le Mans nameplate was downgraded to replace the sub-series previously known as the Tempest Custom, while the previous top Le Mans series was renamed the Le Mans Sport in the same three body styles as earlier, including a four-door hardtop sedan, two-door hardtop coupe and convertible. New for this year were Firebird inspired front bumpers, wrap-around taillights, and crease style body lines. Replacing the Pontiac-built OHC six-cylinder as the base engine for Tempest, LeMans, and LeMans Sport was Chevrolet's 250 cubic-inch straight-six engine. V8 offerings included 350 and 400-cid options with 2 barrel carburation and a  400-cid 4 barrel carbureted engine with dual exhausts. The four-barrel 350 HO was discontinued.

Pontiac wanted to have a car that was less expensive than its Chevrolet counterpart, so in February 1970, Pontiac introduced the T-37 Hardtop Coupe, replacing the Tempest nameplate for the two-door pillared coupe. The T-37 was initially described as "General Motors' lowest-priced hardtop," but was undercut by a base Chevrolet Chevelle hardtop coupe introduced a few weeks later. The T-37 Coupe was followed by the introduction of a new option to T-37, the GT-37 package. The GT-37 represented the "stripper" muscle car package. In addition to the three V8 engines, GT-37 extras included Rally II wheels sans trim rings, white letter tires, chrome tipped dual exhaust, vinyl accents stripes, 3-speed floor shift transmission, sport mirrors, hood locking pins, and GT-37 badging.

1971

For the 1971 model year, Pontiac dropped the Tempest name altogether and introduced its intermediate lineup as T-37, Lemans GT-37, Lemans, and Lemans Sport The GTO and GTO Judge were a separate line. Two-door coupes and four-door sedans were available with T-37, Lemans, and Lemans Sport. The 2-door Hardtop was available across the series, while the convertible model was limited to Lemans Sport and the GTO line. The GT-37 returned as package to T-37 models and was marketed as "The GTO for Kids under 30." The GT-37 received the same feature package as the previous year with the exception of new eyebrow-type side striping similar to that of the GTO Judge model. In mid-March 1971, a second design change for the GT-37 switched the striping to a reflective sword-style stripe sometimes referred to as the 1971 ½ GT-37. 1971 also afforded the customer the opportunity to choose any of Pontiac's optional V8's such as 350, 400, or 455 cubic inch models, including the 455 High Output (HO) engine. The 455 had only been offered on the GTOs in 1970 and came in a  four-barrel version or the  High Output version. All 1971 engines were detuned with lower compression ratios to run on lower-octane regular leaded, low-lead or unleaded gasoline. Brakes were 9.5" drums.

1972
For 1972, all Pontiac intermediates were now Le Mans models and the low-priced T-37 line was replaced by a base Le Mans pillared coupe. The top-line intermediate was the Luxury Le Mans, available in hardtop sedan and coupe models, featuring upgraded interiors compared to regular Le Mans models. The Le Mans Sport was available as a two-door hardtop or convertible with Strato bucket seats and interiors from the Luxury Le Mans. The GTO was changed from a separate series back to an option package on Le Mans and Le Mans Sport coupes. Replacing the previous GT-37 option package for 1972 was the new "Le Mans GT" option, available on Le Mans pillared and hardtop coupes with any V8 ranging from the 350 two-barrel to the 455 HO four-barrel, and also included the same appearance and handling items carried over from the GT-37.

Fourth generation (1973–1977)

From 1973 to 1977, the Le Mans and other GM intermediates were much larger in size than previous models due to evolutionary changes that resulted in larger cars year after year and federally mandated 5 mph crash bumpers that added weight and length. During this period, Pontiac's intermediate lineup included the base Le Mans, Le Mans Sport Coupe, GTO (1973 only), Luxury Le Mans (became the Grand Le Mans in 1975), the Euro-styled Grand Am from 1973 to 1975, and the 1977 Can Am. Body styles were all based on GM's Colonnade design for both sedans and coupes (no convertibles or hardtops offered after 1972) that included center pillars for improved rollover safety standards but eliminated true hardtop design, along with frameless windows similar to a hardtop. Two-door coupes featured triangular "fixed" rear side windows that did not open, which were covered with louvers on the Le Mans, LeMans Sport Coupe, GTO sport coupes, and the new Grand Am.

1973

The 1973 Le Mans, along with all other GM intermediates, was new from the ground up but retained the same wheelbase lengths of 112 inches for two-door coupes, and 116 inches for four-door sedans and station wagons. All models featured the federally mandated 5-mile-per-hour front bumpers along with single headlights. Handling capabilities were greatly improved on all models due to new front-suspension components shared with the F-body Pontiac Firebird and Chevrolet Camaro, improved rear-coil suspension and bias-belted tires (except Grand Ams, which got radial tires).
Engine offerings were carried over from 1972 with revisions to meet the 1973 emission requirements. Standard on base Le Mans sedans and coupes was Chevrolet's 250-cubic-inch inline six-cylinder engine, while the Le Mans Sport Coupe, Luxury Le Mans sedans and coupes, and all Safari wagons got Pontiac's 350-cubic-inch V8 with two-barrel carburetor rated at 150 horsepower standard (optional on base Le Mans models). Optionally available on Le Mans, Le Mans Sport and Luxury Le Mans was a 400-cubic-inch V8 with two-barrel carb and 170 horsepower, a 230-horsepower 400 four-barrel (standard with the GTO option) and a 250-horsepower 455 four-barrel was optional on all models. Planned and listed as an option for the 1973 GTO but never materialized was a 455 Super Duty V8 rated at 310 net horsepower for which introduction was delayed by Pontiac management due to emission issues until the spring of 1973 and then only in the smaller Firebird Formula and Trans Am pony cars.
A three-speed automatic transmission was standard on Le Mans and Luxury Le Mans models while the GTO came with a floor-mounted three-speed with Hurst shifter. Available at extra cost was the three-speed Turbo Hydra-matic with all engines, while a four-speed manual with Hurst shifter was available with the 230-horsepower 400.

1974

Changes for the 1974 Le Mans included new split grilles with horizontal bars on base Le Mans and Le Mans Sport models, while Luxury Le Mans models got chromed vertical bar split grilles. Model offerings in each series were the same as 1973, except for the addition of a new Luxury Le Mans Safari wagon and the deletion of the GTO series from the intermediate line to the compact Pontiac Ventura series. The federally mandated 5-mph bumpers matched the stronger front bumpers of the previous year giving a less curvaceous rear end treatment with vertical taillights and license plate/fuel filler moved above the bumper. Base Le Mans coupes retained the fixed full triangular rear side windows while Luxury Le Mans coupes got a smaller vertical opera window similar to the Grand Prix along with an optional Landau rear quarter vinyl roof. Le Mans Sport Coupes were now available with two rear side window treatments - the louvered triangular version carried over or the opera window with Landau vinyl roof from the Luxury Le Mans.

All engines were carried over from 1973 including the 250 inline-six, and V8s including the 350 two-barrel, 400 two- and four-barrel, and 455 four-barrel. New to the options list for 1974 was a 350 four-barrel. The same assortment of three- and four-speed manual transmissions were carried over for 1974 along with the three-speed Turbo Hydra-matic.
New to the options list for 1974 on all models were GM-specification radial-ply tires manufactured by GM's usual tire suppliers that included revised suspension tuning.

1975
The 1975 Le Mans received mostly trim changes including new crosshatch grilles on base and Sport models, and a distinctive vertical bar grille with more chrome on the Grand Le Mans (renamed from Luxury Le Mans) series cars and only revised nameplates and taillight lenses in the rear. Interiors were revised on top Grand Le Mans cars to include the distinctive wrap-around dashboard from the Grand Prix and Grand Am models with simulated African Crossfire Mahogany trim, a notchback bench seat with armrest in sedans and wagons, or a no-cost choice of the notchback bench or Strato bucket seats in coupes. Base Le Mans and Sport Coupe models carried over trim only slightly revised from 1974 including a revised Custom Cushioned steering wheel.

Pontiac's Maximum Mileage System consisted of GM's new catalytic converter that reduced emissions while improving drivability and fuel economy, a High Energy electronic ignition, and lengthened routine maintenance intervals. Radial tires were standard on all models and a "Radial Tuned Suspension" option was available that included upgraded radial tires along with front and rear sway bars.

Engines were revised for 1975 to meet that year's emission requirements and mated to the catalytic converter, which spelled the end of true dual exhausts. The 250 cubic-inch Chevy inline-six was standard on base Le Mans coupes and sedans while the 350 two-barrel V8 was optional and standard on the Le Mans Sport Coupe, and Grand Le Mans sedans and coupes, and optional engines on all of those models including a 350 four-barrel and a 400 two-barrel. Le Mans and Grand Le Mans Safari wagons came standard with a 400 four-barrel engine that was optional on other models. The 455 V8 was discontinued for all LeMans models for 1975, but still available in the Grand Am. Transmission offerings included a three-speed manual standard with the six-cylinder and 350 two-barrel V8, with the three-speed Turbo Hydra-matic optional with those engines, a "mandatory" option with all other engines in sedans and coupes, and standard on the Safari wagons. The Hurst-shifted four-speed manual was no longer offered.

1976

For 1976, the Le Mans and Grand Le Mans were the only Pontiac intermediate offerings with the discontinuation of the Grand Am series. All models received new rectangular headlights with distinct grilles unique to the base and Le Mans Sport and another one for the Grand Le Mans. The Grand Le Mans had the instrument panel of the 1973-75 Gran Am, while the Le Mans and Le Mans Sport continued with the regular dash. The 1973-75 Luxury Le Mans had the regular Le Mans instrument panel.

The Chevy-built 250 straight-six was now standard on all Le Mans and Grand Le Mans sedans and coupes along with the Le Mans Sport Coupe with V8 options including a new "Oldsmobile-built" 260 V8 and Pontiac V8s of 350 and 400 cubic inches with two- or four-barrel carburetion (400 four-barrel still standard on all Safari wagons), along with the return of the 455 four-barrel V8 after a one-year absence. The three-speed manual transmission was standard with the Chevy six with Turbo Hydra-matic optional, the latter now the only transmission offered with all V8s except the small 260 which could be ordered with a five-speed manual in the Le Mans Sport Coupe.

Also new for 1976 was an "Enforcer" police package on Le Mans sedans with either the 400 or 455 V8s that included Turbo Hydra-matic transmission, variable-ratio power steering, heavy-duty power front disc brakes, and suspension tuning.

1977

The 1977 model year was the last for the Le Mans and Grand Le Mans built off the 1973-vintage Colonnade body. Appearance changes were limited to revised grilles and taillight lenses. Engine offerings were revised with Buick's 231 cubic-inch V6 replacing the Chevy inline-six as the base power plant in sedans and coupes. The base V8 (standard on Safari wagons and optional on other models) was Pontiac's new 301 cubic-inch engine based on the same V8 engine block as other Pontiac V8s but utilized many lightweight components. Optional V8s were pared down to Pontiac-built 350 and 400 four-barrel powerplants. The three-speed manual was the standard transmission on V6 models, while the Turbo Hydra-matic was optional and the only transmission available with the V8 engines. Those drivetrain offerings were available in 49 states. In California, Pontiac V8s were not offered for 1977 due to the inability to meet that state's more stringent regulations. For California, the Buick V6 was standard on most models with the available V8 engines were Oldsmobile's 350 and 403 four-barrel engines. Turbo Hydra-matic was the only transmission offered in California.

A sporty-performance model based on the Le Mans Sport Coupe called the Pontiac Can Am was a one-year only offering for 1977. The Can Am came standard with the 400 four-barrel V8 in 49 states or the Olds 403 four-barrel in California, along with Turbo Hydra-matic transmission, a Grand Prix instrument panel and console, Strato bucket seats, and rear spoiler. It was partially intended as a replacement for the 1973-75 Grand Am, whose departure had caused A-body sales to drop significantly, while these Pontiac models had been the weakest sellers of the line with a high percentage of low-profit fleet sales.

For the final year of the Colonnade Le Mans models, they were joined by newly downsized B-body Catalina and Bonneville full-sized cars, which weighed a few pounds less than the "intermediates" and rode on the same 116-inch wheelbase length as the Le Mans sedans and Safari wagons and also had similar dimensions as far as length and width were concerned. The intermediates would have to wait one more year for downsizing, and although the new B-bodies made them redundant, it was still considered necessary to sell both as a hedge in case the B-body cars proved to be troublesome. In addition, many customers still preferred the Colonnade intermediates to the B-bodies and they continued to sell well for their final year, mostly thanks to the coupe models.

Fifth generation (1978–1981)

In 1978, the Le Mans and other GM mid-sized cars were considerably downsized and lost some 600-800 lb. Pontiac's engines were also downsized, with the standard engine being the Buick 3.8 L 231 ci V6, Pontiac 265 ci V8, or optional Pontiac 4.9 L 301 ci V8 for 1978, (a Chevy 305 ci V8 in California). 1978 also saw Pontiac's 350 ci & 400 ci engine production shut down after many years of service as its hallmark V8s. A limited production run of 400ci engines was made, but were only available in 1978 and 1979 Trans Ams equipped with the four-speed manual transmission. Chevrolet's 350 V8 was available in 1979 LeMans Safaris (station wagon) only.

From 1978 to 1980, Pontiac's mid-sized lineup included the base Le Mans, Grand Le Mans, and a revived Grand Am; all available as a Coupe, Sedan, or Wagon. In 1980, the Grand Am was only offered only as a coupe, and the "Grand Am" nameplate was again discontinued until 1985, when it was used on Pontiac's new compact car — a form the Grand Am would take for the next two decades.

The final year for the mid-sized Le Mans was 1981, with sedans featuring a new formal roofline shared with its divisional counterparts. Only base and Grand Le Mans models were offered initially, joined mid-year by a new LJ trim level positioned between the base and Grand models. The car was given a new Firebird-esque slanted nose which made the 2-door coupe popular in NASCAR, especially as a superspeedway race car in 1981, which was the first year these cars were used in the series. A Le Mans driven by Cale Yarborough won the 1983 Daytona 500, and one driven by Tim Richmond at the 1983 Pocono 500. Engine offerings by this time included Buick's 231 CID V6, Pontiac's 4.3 L 265 CID V8, Pontiac's 301 CID V8, and Chevrolet's 305 CID V8 (for California only).

Discontinuation 
For the 1982 model year, General Motors underwent a revision of its mid-size model lines, with particular attention focused on the Pontiac brand. In addition to the discontinuation of the LeMans, additional changes were made to reduce model overlap. As part of the 1982 introduction of the front-wheel drive A platform, the Pontiac 6000 served as the direct successor for the LeMans sedan and station wagon. Though introduced as a premium model over the LeMans, the Grand Prix coupe continued in production (on the re-designated G platform), accommodating for the withdrawal of the LeMans coupe.

The Grand LeMans itself was not directly replaced for 1982, though its withdrawal was accommodated through a revision to both the G platform and the full-size B platform.  Rather than undergo an expensive redesign to downsize the vehicle, Pontiac moved the Bonneville nameplate from its full-size line to the G-body four-door sedan. Sharing the newly-introduced notchback body (for 1981)  of the four-door Buick Regal, Oldsmobile Cutlass, and Chevrolet Malibu, the Bonneville was slotted above the 6000 in the Pontiac model line, receiving many of the styling elements of its B-body predecessor.  In Canada, Pontiac continued to use the Grand LeMans name for the G-body Bonneville through the 1983 model year. As part of the model revision, the previous Catalina/Bonneville full-size line was replaced by the Pontiac Parisienne (the nameplate used for the Bonneville by GM Canada), adopting a minor styling revision.

For 1984, the Bonneville Safari station wagon was discontinued, with the Bonneville four-door sedan produced through 1986; for 1987, the model line shifted to front-wheel drive, becoming a counterpart of the Buick LeSabre and Oldsmobile Delta 88. For 1988, the Grand Prix adopted the front-wheel drive W platform; in 1990, the first Grand Prix sedan was introduced as the replacement for the 6000 (replacing it entirely for 1992).

Sixth generation (1988–1993)

For the 1988 model year, Pontiac revived the LeMans nameplate in North America, replacing the Pontiac 1000 as the smallest Pontiac model line. It was an early introduction for the model year, with sales beginning in June 1987. Marking the switch of the subcompact T-body to front-wheel drive in North America, the LeMans was a captive import of the Daewoo LeMans from South Korea, offered in three-door hatchback (called the "Aerocoupe") and four-door sedan bodystyles (a five-door hatchback was also offered in New Zealand). The joint venture with Daewoo, in which the two companies built a new factory expressly to assemble the new T-car, had been announced in January 1984 but was delayed due to a period of political turmoil.

The throttle body injected 1.6-liter engine producing  at 5,600 rpm was also an Opel design, built in South Korea. The introductory lineup all had this engine and consisted of the Value Leader ("VL", only as a three-door Aerocoupe), the standard LeMans (Sedan or Aerocoupe), and the SE (Sedan only) on top. A four-speed manual was standard equipment, with a five-speed version (standard on the SE) and a three-speed automatic optionally available. The LeMans was also sold in Canada through General Motors' Passport International Division as the "Passport Optima."

In February 1988, a new model was released, going on sale the following month: the new sportier Pontiac LeMans GSE Aerocoupe, positioned similarly to the Opel Kadett GSi, was equipped with an Australian-built  2.0-litre four-cylinder engine also used in the Pontiac Sunbird. Unlike the Kadett GSi, however, the GSE only had throttle body injection and its maximum power arrived at a leisurely 4,800 rpm. The GSE was available in red, white, or silver with 14 inch alloy wheels, fog lights and a rear spoiler. The GSE also received the Recaro-style seats of the Kadett GSi. The five-speed manual transmission used with the larger engine was an Opel design, built in Japan by Isuzu. This version was sold in Canada as the Passport Optima GSi. Along with the introduction of the GSE, the Pontiac LeMans SE sedan now featured the GSE's 2.0-litre four-cylinder engine while the earlier base model was renamed LE; the LE received the five-speed manual as standard equipment, leaving the four-speed for the VL only. The two-liter SE Sedan was dropped after the 1989 model year.

The GSE seemed good on paper, but it cost more than the Honda Civic Si and more than a Sunbird with the same engine, while the LeMans' reputation for troubled quality also did it no favors. The less-than-peppy engine combined with low-geared steering and a vague shift linkage meant that its performance did not match the sporty exterior; it had better gas mileage than many of its competitors but that did not help create a youthful image. For 1990, Pontiac added quicker steering on the GSE but the model did not return for 1991. This left the Base model (3-door only) and the LE (both bodystyles).

For the 1992 model year the LeMans received some very minor changes including amber turn signals at the rear and a new color (Bright Yellow). The lineup was renamed SE "Value Leader" Aerocoupe, with the better equipped version called SE (Aerocoupe/Sedan). Model year sales dropped to under 20,000 cars, a far cry from the planned 90,000 per year. For 1993 the LeMans received a facelift, with a reworked front, new side moldings, and superficially changed taillights. The mechanical parts, however, remained mostly as they had been in 1987. This version was called the Asüna SE/GT in the Canadian market, where it replaced the Passport Optima. The SE was available as a three-door hatchback or four-door sedan, while the sporty and better equipped GT only came as a hatchback. The Asüna SE and GT were only available for the 1993 model year; in 1994, the Asüna brand was discontinued altogether. In North America, poor quality tarnished sales as well as the relationship between the companies. Daewoo's joint venture with General Motors ended in 1992, and the Pontiac LeMans (and Asüna SE/GT) were discontinued after the 1993 model year with no replacement, ending the final use of the LeMans nameplate.

In 1994, Daewoo updated the LeMans/Racer and renamed it the Cielo; the model line continued to be built in numerous countries until 2016. In North America, Pontiac left the subcompact segment until 2005, when they introduced a rebadged Chevrolet Aveo four-door in Canada as the Pontiac Wave. This was replaced by the Pontiac G3 hatchback for 2009; this was briefly marketed in the United States as well. In 2010 (the final year of Pontiac), the G3 was available only in Canada.

New Zealand
It was also sold in New Zealand as the Pontiac LeMans from 1989, becoming the first Pontiac badged car to be sold on the NZ market since the Canadian-sourced Pontiac Laurentian of the 1960s. In addition to the bodystyles available in North America, New Zealand also received the five-door hatchback.

References

External links

 

1970s cars
1980s cars
Cars of Canada
Convertibles
Coupés
Mid-size cars
Motor vehicles manufactured in the United States
LeMans
Rear-wheel-drive vehicles
Sedans
Station wagons
Police vehicles
Cars introduced in 1962